Martapura may refer to:

Martapura, South Kalimantan
Martapura, South Sumatra, the capital of East Ogan Komering Ulu Regency
Martapura River, southeast Borneo, Indonesia
Martapura F.C., an Indonesian football club